Skateboards 2 Scrapers is an EP by Bay area rap group The Pack, released on December 19, 2006. It includes the hit single "Vans", which was ranked as the fifth best song on Rolling Stone's 100 Best Songs of 2006 list. The second single was "I'm Shinin'". The whole album was produced by Young L.

Track listing
"Vans"
"I'm Shinin'"
"Ride My Bike"
"Candy"
"Oh Go"
"Freaky Bopper"
"Vans (Remix)" (featuring Too $hort & Mistah F.A.B.)
"Dum Didi Dum" (featuring Too $hort)

References

The Pack (group) albums
2006 debut EPs
Jive Records EPs